Field Marshal Herbert Charles Onslow Plumer, 1st Viscount Plumer,  (13 March 1857 – 16 July 1932) was a senior British Army officer of the First World War. After commanding V Corps at the Second Battle of Ypres in April 1915, he took command of the Second Army in May 1915 and in June 1917 won an overwhelming victory over the German Army at the Battle of Messines, which started with the simultaneous explosion of a series of mines placed by the Royal Engineers' tunnelling companies beneath German lines, which created  large craters and was described as the loudest explosion in human history. He later served as Commander-in-Chief of the British Army of the Rhine and then as Governor of Malta before becoming High Commissioner of the British Mandate for Palestine in 1925 and retiring in 1928.

Military career
Born the son of Hall Plumer and Louisa Alice Plumer (née Turnley) and educated at Eton College and the Royal Military College, Sandhurst, Plumer was commissioned as a lieutenant into the 65th Regiment of Foot on 11 September 1876. He joined his regiment in India and became adjutant of his battalion on 29 April 1879. Promoted to captain on 29 May 1882, he accompanied his battalion to the Sudan in 1884 as part of the Nile Expedition. Plumer was present at the battle of El Teb in February 1884 and the battle of Tamai in March 1884, and was mentioned in Despatches. He spent from 1886 to 1887 attending the Staff College, Camberley, before being appointed Deputy-Assistant Adjutant-General in Jersey on 7 May 1890. He was promoted to major on 22 January 1893 and posted to the 2nd Battalion the York and Lancaster Regiment before being appointed assistant military secretary to the General Officer Commanding Cape Colony in December 1895. He went to Southern Rhodesia in 1896 to disarm the local police force following the Jameson Raid and then later that year returned there to command the Matabele Relief Force during the Second Matabele War. He became deputy assistant adjutant-general at Aldershot with promotion to brevet lieutenant colonel on 8 May 1897.

In 1899 Plumer returned to Southern Rhodesia where he raised a force of mounted infantry and, having been promoted to the substantive rank of lieutenant-colonel on 17 October 1900, he led them at the Relief of Mafeking during the Second Boer War. He was promoted to colonel on 29 November 1900 and was then given command of a mixed force which captured General Christiaan de Wet's wagon train at Hamelfontein in February 1901. Plumer arrived back in the United Kingdom in April 1902, and two months later was received in audience by King Edward VII on his return. In a despatch dated 23 June 1902, Lord Kitchener, Commander-in-Chief in South Africa during the latter part of the war, wrote how Plumer had "invariable displayed military qualifications of a very high order. Few officers have rendered better service."

He was promoted to major general for distinguished service in the field on 22 August 1902, and was appointed Commander of the 4th Brigade within 1st Army Corps on 1 October 1902. The following year he became General Officer Commanding 10th Division within IV Army Corps and General Officer Commanding Eastern District in December 1903. He became Quartermaster-General to the Forces in February 1904, General Officer Commanding 7th Division in April 1906 and General Officer Commanding 5th Division within Irish Command in May 1907. Promoted to lieutenant general on 4 November 1908, he went on to be General Officer Commanding-in-Chief for Northern Command in November 1911.

First World War
Following the unexpected death of Sir James Grierson on his arrival in France in 1914, Plumer was considered for command of one of two Corps of the British Expeditionary Force alongside Douglas Haig: this position eventually went to Horace Smith-Dorrien. Plumer was sent to France in February 1915 and given command of V Corps which he led at the Second Battle of Ypres in April 1915. He took command of the Second Army in May 1915 and, having been promoted to full general on 11 June 1915, he won an overwhelming victory over the German Army at the Battle of Messines in June 1917. The battle started with the simultaneous explosion of a series of mines placed by the Royal Engineers' tunnelling companies beneath German lines. The detonation created  large craters and was described as the loudest explosion in human history. After the mines were fired, Plumer's soldiers left their trenches and advanced 3,000 yards. He won further victories at the battle of the Menin Road Ridge and the battle of Polygon Wood in September 1917 and the battle of Broodseinde in October 1917 advancing another 5,000 yards in the process.

In November 1917 Plumer was given command of the British Expeditionary Force sent to the Italian Front after the disaster at Caporetto. Early in 1918, Plumer was sought by Lloyd George for the position of Chief of the Imperial General Staff as a replacement for William Robertson: he declined the position. Plumer instead commanded the Second Army during the final stages of the war, during the German spring offensive and the Allied Hundred Days Offensive.

Later career
Plumer was appointed General Officer Commanding-in-Chief the British Army of the Rhine in December 1918 and Governor of Malta in May 1919. He was promoted to field marshal on 31 July 1919, and was created Baron Plumer of Messines and of Bilton on 18 October 1919. In August 1925 he was appointed High Commissioner of the British Mandate for Palestine. He resisted Arab pressure to reverse commitments made by the British Government in the Balfour Declaration, and dealt firmly with both the Zionists and the Arab Nationalists. On one occasion, an Arab delegation protested a proposal by Jewish battalions to install their regimental colours in the chief synagogues, saying they "wouldn't be responsible for the consequences". Plumer replied, 'That's all right, you're not asked to be responsible for the consequences. I'll be responsible." In Mandatory Palestine Plumer gained a reputation as being "genuinely even handed" and was one of the few British administrators who was consistently popular with both the Jewish community and the Arab community in that territory. Privately, he was sympathetic to the cause of establishing a homeland for the Jewish people; however, he tried his best to "be fair" to Arab concerns as well while he was High Commissioner there.

 
On 24 July 1927 he conducted the inauguration ceremony for the Menin Gate memorial at Ypres in Belgium. 

Plumer was created Viscount Plumer for his "long and distinguished public services" on 3 June 1929.

Death
Plumer died at his home in Knightsbridge in London on 16 July 1932 at the age of 75. His body was subsequently interred in Westminster Abbey.

Family
In July 1884 Plumer married Annie Constance Goss (1858–1941), daughter of George and Eleanor Goss; they had three daughters and one son.

Honours 

British
 Knight Grand Cross of the Order of the Bath – 1 January 1918 (KCB – 29 June 1906; CB – 19 April 1901)
 Knight Grand Cross of the Order of St Michael and St George – 1 January 1916
 Knight Grand Cross of the Royal Victorian Order – 14 July 1917
 Knight Grand Cross of the Order of the British Empire – 1924
 Knight of Grace of the Venerable Order of St John – 23 June 1925
Foreign
 Legion of Honour (France) – 14 December 1917
 Croix de Guerre (Belgium) – 11 March 1918
 Croix de Guerre with palm (France) – 11 March 1919
 Distinguished Service Medal (United States) – 12 July 1919
 Grand Cordon, Order of the Rising Sun (Japan) – 21 January 1921

See also
 Menin Gate

References

Sources

Further reading

External links

 National Portrait Gallery

|-
 

|-

|-

|-
 

|-

|-

|-

|-

1857 births
1932 deaths
British field marshals
Graduates of the Royal Military College, Sandhurst
Knights Grand Cross of the Order of St Michael and St George
Knights Grand Cross of the Order of the Bath
Knights Grand Cross of the Order of the British Empire
Knights Grand Cross of the Royal Victorian Order
Grand Cordons of the Order of the Rising Sun
People from Kensington
Mandatory Palestine
British High Commissioners of Palestine
Viscounts in the Peerage of the United Kingdom
British Army personnel of the Mahdist War
British Army personnel of the Second Boer War
British colonial army officers
British Army generals of World War I
Diplomatic peers
People of the Second Matabele War
Governors and Governors-General of Malta
Burials at Westminster Abbey
Recipients of the Croix de Guerre 1914–1918 (France)
People educated at Eton College
Presidents of the Marylebone Cricket Club
Graduates of the Staff College, Camberley
Barons created by George V
Viscounts created by George V
Military personnel from London
York and Lancaster Regiment officers